MAA FOCUS is the newsmagazine of the Mathematical Association of America. It carries news items and short articles of interest to the organization's members.

History and profile
The magazine was first published in March 1981; the first editor was Marcia P. Sward, who held that position until September 1985. Beginning in 2009 the magazine is published six times a year; previously it was published nine times a year. The magazine is printed on glossy paper with a final trim size of 8-1/4 inches wide by 10-5/8 inches high. Circulation in 2008 was 22,400 copies.

References

External links 
 Official site
 Past issues

Mathematics magazines
Magazines established in 1981
Magazines published in Washington, D.C.
Bimonthly magazines published in the United States
Science and technology magazines published in the United States